Singa is a town  located in the Sennar State of Sudan at an elevation of  above sea level. Its population was recorded to be 259,000 in 2002.

Singa, also spelled Sinjah, is possibly the capital of Sennar State and is characterized by the diversity of its natural environment, habitat, water resources, and livestock. It remains publicly unclear whether Singa or Sennar is the state capital. A large veterinary research station has been founded in the city. Its economic activities vary from Agriculture to pastoralism. Important crops are sorghum, gum Arabic, and fruits such as guava, banana and mango.

Archaeological discovery
Singa is notable for the archaeological discovery of an old human fossil, the 'Singa Skull' which was discovered in Singa in 1924 by the British governor of Blue Nile Province. The skull is about 160,000 years old and belongs to the Stone Age, Pleistocene Age. It coincided with the Neanderthals and the Peking man. Currently the skull is displayed at the British Museum in London.

Connections
Singa is served by several bank branches, a hospital, and a hotel. A network of track roads and railways connects the city with its major neighboring towns and cities.

References

Populated places in Sennar (state)
Archaeological sites in Sudan
Paleoanthropological sites